Mansur ad-Din (died 1424) was a Sultan of the Sultanate of Adal and a son of Sa'ad ad-Din II.

Reign
On the death of his brother Sabr ad-Din III, Sultan Mansur succeeded the throne and enjoyed support of his brother Muhammad. 

Early in his reign he launched an expedition against an Ethiopian Christian monarch, Emperor Dawit and drove him to Yedaya which was described as his royal seat, destroyed the Solomonic army, where according to Maqrizi, he was captured and killed.  

His death however presumed to be an event of major importance, is not recorded by the Ethiopian Chronicles.  The Ethiopian historian Taddesse Tamrat argues it's because the Ethiopian royal chronicles often deliberately attempted to suppress the violent deaths of the kings whose reigns they extol. 

Mansur later made his way towards to Moha mountains where  surrounded a considerable imperial force of 30.000 soldiers. He besieged them for two months by the end of which they were suffering from hunger and thirst. He then offered them an ultimatum of embracing Islam or return to their homes. Some 10.000 accepted the new faith of Islam; the remaining ones went home.

Soon after this the fortunes of war again changed. In 1424 another Christian monarch, Emperor Yeshaq, set forth with a huge army which Maqrizi likens to a swarm of locusts. Mansur and his brother Muhammad were captured and once more the former lands came under the rule of the Christian Amhara

See also
Walashma dynasty

Notes

Sultans of the Adal Sultanate
15th-century monarchs in Africa
1424 deaths
Year of birth unknown
15th-century Somalian people